The following tables list all minor planets and comets that have been visited by robotic spacecraft.

List of minor planets visited by spacecraft 
A total of 17 minor planets (asteroids, dwarf planets, and Kuiper belt objects) have been visited by space probes. Moons (not directly orbiting the Sun) and planets are not minor planets and thus are not included in the table below.

Incidental flybys 
In addition to the above listed objects, four asteroids have been imaged by spacecraft at distances too large to resolve features (over 100,000 km), and are labeled as such.

List of comets visited by spacecraft 

{| class="wikitable sortable"
|-
! colspan=4 style="background-color:#D4E2FC;" | Comet
! colspan=5 style="background-color:#FFFF99;" | Space probe
|-
! rowspan=2 style="background-color:#edf3fe;" width=110 | Name
! rowspan=2 style="background-color:#edf3fe;" class="unsortable"| Image
! rowspan=2 style="background-color:#edf3fe; font-weight: normal;" | Dimensions(km)(a)
! rowspan=2 style="background-color:#edf3fe;" width=70 | Discoveryyear
! rowspan=2 style="background-color:#ffffcc;" | Name
! colspan=3 style="background-color:#ffffcc;"| Closest approach
! rowspan=2 style="background-color:#ffffcc;" class="unsortable"| Remarks
|-
! width=60 style="background-color:#ffffcc;" | year
! width=60 style="background-color:#ffffcc;" | in km
! width=60 style="background-color:#ffffcc; font-weight: normal;" | in radii(b)

|-
| Giacobini–Zinner
| bgcolor=#334d4c | 
| align=center | 2
| align=center | 1900
| ICE
| align=center | 1985
| align=right | 7,800
| align=right | 7,800
| first flyby of a comet

|- style="background-color: #f2f2f2;"
| rowspan="6" | Halley
| rowspan="6" bgcolor="#1f0002" |
| rowspan="6" align="center" | 15×9
| rowspan="6" align="center" | 
| Vega 1
| align=center | 1986
| align=right | 8,889
| align=right | 1,620
| flyby
|- style="background-color: #f2f2f2;"
| Vega 2
| align=center | 1986
| align=right | 8,030
| align=right | 1,460
| flyby
|- style="background-color:#cccccc;"
| Suisei
| align=center | 1986
| align=right | 151,000
| align=right | 27,450
| distant flyby
|- style="background-color:#cccccc;"
| Sakigake
| align=center | 1986
| align=right | 6,990,000
| align=right | 1,270,747
| distant flyby
|- style="background-color: #f2f2f2;"
| Giotto
| align=center | 1986
| align=right | 596
| align=right | 108
| flyby; first direct images of a comet nucleus
|- style="background-color:#cccccc;"
|ICE 
| align=center | 1986
| align=right | 31,000,000
| align=right | 5,647,000
|distant flyby
|-
| Grigg–Skjellerup 
| bgcolor=#606060 | 
| align=center | 2.6
| align=center | 1902
| Giotto
| align=center | 1992
| align=right | 200
| align=right | 154
| flyby

|-
| Borrelly
| bgcolor=black| 
| align=center | 8×4×4
| align=center | 1904
| Deep Space 1
| align=center | 2001
| align=right | 2,171
| align=right | 814
| flyby; closest approach in September 2001 when probe entered the comet's coma

|-
| Wild 2
| bgcolor=black| 
| align=center | 5.5×4.0×3.3
| align=center | 1978
| Stardust
| align=center | 2004
| align=right | 240
| align=right | 113
| flyby; first sample return mission from comet to Earth (2006)

|- style="background-color: #f2f2f2;"
| rowspan=3| Tempel 1
| rowspan=3 bgcolor=black| 
| rowspan=3 align=center| 7.6×4.9
| rowspan=3 align=center | 1867
| Deep Impact
| align=center | 2005
| align=right | 500
| align=right | 80
| flyby; delivered an impactor
|- style="background-color: #f2f2f2;"
| Deep Impacts impactor vehicle
| align=center | 2005
| align=right | landed
| align=right | landed
| first landing on a comet (blasted a crater)
|- style="background-color: #f2f2f2;"
| Stardust
| align=center | 2011
| align=right | 181
| align=right | 57.9
| flyby; imaged the crater created by Deep Impact
|-
| Hartley 2
| bgcolor=black| 
| align=center | 1.4
| align=center | 1986
| EPOXI(Deep Impact)
| align=center | 2010
| align=right | 700
| align=right | 1,000
| flyby; smallest comet visited

|-
| rowspan=2| Churyumov–Gerasimenko
| rowspan=2 bgcolor=black| 
| rowspan=2 align=center | 4.1×3.3×1.8
| rowspan=2 align=center | 1969
| Rosetta
| align=center | 2016
| align=right | landed
| align=right | landed
| first orbiter of comet (November 2014); impacted surface as of 2016; OSIRIS captured image with 11 cm/px-resolution in Spring 2015
|-
| Philae{{nowrap|{{small|(Rosettas lander)}}}}
| align=center | 2014
| align=right | landed
| align=right | landed
| first soft landing on a comet (November 2014)

|-
! colspan=9 style="font-weight: normal; font-size: 0.85em; text-align: left; padding: 6px 4px;" |Notes''':
 (b)Closest approach given in multiples of the comet's (average mean) radius List ordered in ascending order by a comet's first visit.
|}

 Spacecraft visited by comets 
Comet C/2013 A1 passed close by planet Mars in October 2014, closer than the Moon is to Earth. This was so close that the event was deemed dangerous to spacecraft in orbit around Mars. Spacecraft that were active at that time included 2001 Mars Odyssey, Mars Express, MAVEN, Mars Orbiter Mission, and Mars Reconnaissance Orbiter in Mars orbit – and two on the surface – Mars Exploration Rover Opportunity and the Mars Science Laboratory Curiosity''.

Future visits

Planned

Proposals  
The following table lists minor planets that are proposed to be visited by spacecraft missions that have not yet been approved.

Past proposals

Failed missions
Former targets for launched spacecraft.

Cancelled or not developed missions

See also 
 List of missions to minor planets
 List of missions to comets
 List of missions to the outer planets
 List of Solar System probes
 List of landings on extraterrestrial bodies
 List of extraterrestrial orbiters

References 
 

Minor planets and comets visited by spacecraft
visited by spacecraft